Alfonso Rebochong Oiterong (9 October 1924 – 30 August 1994) was a politician from Palau who served as the country's Vice President from 1981 to 1985. Despite internal problems in Palau during the Remeliik administration, Oiterong was perceived as an honest, capable and dedicated civil servant. In addition of the vice presidential post, he was the minister of state aka minister of foreign affairs. 

When President Haruo Remeliik was assassinated, Oiterong returned from New York to Palau on 2 July to take office of the President. He served as President from 2 July to 25 October 1985. Oiterong lost the 1985 special election to Lazarus Salii.

References

1924 births
1994 deaths
Presidents of Palau
Vice presidents of Palau
Foreign Ministers of Palau
20th-century Palauan politicians